Ladozhsky Bridge is uppermost bridge across the Neva River. It is located in Leningrad Oblast, near Kirovsk. It is a part of Murmansk Highway (M18 highway). The bridge was built between 1978 to 1983, although one half of the bridge was opened to traffic in 1981 prior to the full opening.

References 

Bascule bridges
Road bridges in Russia
Bridges completed in 1981